Zachary Ryan Short (born May 29, 1995) is an American professional baseball shortstop for the Detroit Tigers of Major League Baseball (MLB). He made his MLB debut in 2021.

Amateur career
Short attended Kingston High School in Kingston, New York and played college baseball at Sacred Heart University. In 2015, he played collegiate summer baseball with the Chatham Anglers of the Cape Cod Baseball League.

Professional career

Chicago Cubs
The Chicago Cubs selected Short in the 17th round of the 2016 Major League Baseball draft. After signing, Short spent his first professional season with both the Arizona League Cubs and Eugene Emeralds where he batted .257 with one home run and 31 RBIs in 53 games between the two teams. He played 2017 with the South Bend Cubs and Myrtle Beach Pelicans, slashing a combined .250/.383/.419 with 13 home runs, 47 RBIs, and 18 stolen bases in 131 games, and 2018 with the Tennessee Smokies, hitting .227 with 17 home runs and 59 RBIs in 124 games.

The Cubs invited Short to spring training in 2019. He began 2019 with the Iowa Cubs, but also spent time with Tennessee and in the Arizona League while rehabbing. Over 63 games in total for the season, Short batted .235 with six home runs and 25 RBIs. Following the season, he played in the Arizona Fall League with the Mesa Solar Sox.

Short was added to Chicago's 40–man roster following the 2019 season.

Detroit Tigers
On August 31, 2020, the Cubs traded Short to the Detroit Tigers for Cameron Maybin shortly before the trade deadline. He did not play a minor league game in 2020 due to the cancellation of the minor league season caused by the COVID-19 pandemic.

On April 21, 2021, Short was promoted to the major leagues for the first time. He made his MLB debut that day as the starting third baseman against the Pittsburgh Pirates. On April 23, Short recorded his first MLB hit, a single off of Kansas City Royals starter Mike Minor. On June 26, Short recorded his first MLB home run, a two-run home run, off Houston Astros starter Framber Valdez. He finished the 2021 season with a .141 batting average in 61 games.

Since being traded to the Tigers, Short has been repeatedly optioned or assigned to the Toledo Mud Hens recalled back to the Tigers. As of August 23, 2022, Short currently plays for the Tigers.

References

External links

1995 births
Living people
Arizona League Cubs players
Baseball players from New York (state)
Chatham Anglers players
Detroit Tigers players
Eugene Emeralds players
Iowa Cubs players
Major League Baseball infielders
Mesa Solar Sox players
Myrtle Beach Pelicans players
Sacred Heart Pioneers baseball players
South Bend Cubs players
Sportspeople from Kingston, New York
Tennessee Smokies players